Sairuat Kima (born 7 November 1997) is an Indian professional footballer who plays as a defender for Mohammedan in the I-League.

Career
Kima began his career in Mizoram with Chanmari before joining DSK Shivajians in 2015. He played for the club's youth academy and also played for the senior side during the 2016 Durand Cup. He was promoted to the senior side before the tournament began.

He made his professional debut for the club during their first I-League match of the season against Mumbai on 8 January 2017. He started and played the full match despite DSK Shivajians falling to a 1–0 defeat.

Jamshedpur
On 23 July 2017, Kima was selected in the 9th round of the 2017–18 ISL Players Draft by Jamshedpur for the 2017–18 Indian Super League season. After not playing a single game during the ISL season, Kima made his debut for Jamshedpur on 12 April 2018 in their Super Cup quarter-final match against Goa. He started and played only one half as he had to be substituted for goalkeeper Rafique Ali Sardar after Subrata Pal was sent off. Jamshedpur would lose the match 1–5 with four of the Goan goals occurring after Kima was subbed off.

Bengaluru
On 11 June 2018, Bengaluru FC announced they had signed Kima on a two-year deal. He made his first team debut for the club against his former club, Jamshedpur F.C on February 27, 2019, where Bengaluru F.C lost to the host 5–1.

Mohammedan
In June 2022, Kima joined I-League club Mohammedan, on a two-year deal. On 16 August, he made his debut for the club against Goa in the Durand Cup, which ended in a 3–1 comeback win. Five days later, he was named Player of the Match against Jamshedpur, which ended in a dominating 3–0 win.

Career statistics

Club

Honours
Bengaluru
Indian Super League: 2018–19

References

External links 
 Jamshedpur FC Profile

1997 births
Living people
People from Mizoram
Indian footballers
DSK Shivajians FC players
Jamshedpur FC players
Association football defenders
Footballers from Mizoram
I-League players
Bengaluru FC players
Sudeva Delhi FC players
Indian Super League players
Chanmari FC players
India youth international footballers
Mohammedan SC (Kolkata) players